Gashnuiyeh or Goshnuiyeh, also rendered as Gushnuyeh and Gashnooeyeh, may refer to:
 Gashnuiyeh-ye Bala
 Gashnuiyeh-ye Pain